The 1977 Queensland state election was held on 12 November 1977.

Retiring Members
Note: Clayfield Liberal MLA Ivan Brown and Greenslopes Liberal MLA Keith Hooper had both died prior to the election; no by-elections were held.

Labor
Harry Dean MLA (Sandgate)
Evan Marginson MLA (Wolston)
Jack Melloy MLA (Nudgee)

National
David Cory MLA (Warwick)

Liberal
Geoff Chinchen MLA (Mount Gravatt)
Arthur Crawford MLA (Wavell)
Harold Lowes MLA (Brisbane)

Candidates
Sitting members at the time of the election are shown in bold text.

See also
 1977 Queensland state election
 Members of the Queensland Legislative Assembly, 1974–1977
 Members of the Queensland Legislative Assembly, 1977–1980
 List of political parties in Australia

References
 

Candidates for Queensland state elections